West Fork Stinking River is a  long 2nd order tributary to the Stinking River in Pittsylvania County, Virginia.  This is the only stream of this name in the United States.

Course 
West Fork Stinking River rises about 3.5 miles southeast of Sycamore, Virginia and then flows generally southeast to join the Stinking River about 1 mile northwest of Greenfield.

Watershed 
West Fork Stinking River drains  of area, receives about 45.6 in/year of precipitation, has a wetness index of 413.18, and is about 43% forested.

See also 
 List of Virginia Rivers

References 

Rivers of Virginia
Rivers of Pittsylvania County, Virginia
Tributaries of the Roanoke River